The characteristic of cynocephaly, or cynocephalus, having the head of a canid, typically that of a dog or jackal, is a widely attested mythical phenomenon existing in many different forms and contexts. The literal meaning of "cynocephaly" is "dog-headed"; however, that this refers to a human body with a dog head is implied. Such cynocephalics are known in mythology and legend from many parts of the world, including ancient Egypt, India, Greece, and China. Further mentions come from the medieval East and Europe. In modern popular culture cynocephalics are also encountered as characters in books, comics, and graphic novels. Cynocephaly is generally distinguished from lycanthropy (werewolfism) and dogs that can talk.

In addition, the Greeks and Romans called a species of apes cynocephalus (these apes are suspected to be baboons).

Etymology
The word cynocephaly is taken (through Latin) from the Greek word κυνοκέφαλοι kynokephaloi, plural of the word κυνοκέφαλος, from kyno– (combining form of κύων kyōn) meaning "dog" and κεφαλή kephalē meaning "head".

The same "dog" root is found in the name Cynomorpha ("dog-shaped") for a sub-group of the family Cercopithecidae, which contains many species of macaques and baboons.

Ancient Greece and Egypt
Cynocephaly was familiar to the ancient Greeks from representations of the Egyptian gods, Duamutef (son of Horus), Wepwawet (the opener of the ways), and Anubis (the Egyptian god of the dead). The Greek word "dog-head" also identified a sacred Egyptian baboon with the face of a dog. Rather than literally depicting a hybrid human-animal state, these cynocephalic portrayals of deities conveyed those deities' therianthropic ability to shift between fully human and fully animal states. In an Ancient Egyptian hybrid image, the head represents the original form of the being depicted, so that, as the Egyptologist Henry Fischer put it, "a lion-headed goddess is a lion-goddess in human form, while a royal sphinx, conversely, is a man who has assumed the form of a lion." This non-literal approach to depicting deities may have confused visitors from Greece, leading them to believe that Egyptians worshipped cynocephalic gods, or even that mortal cynocephalic entities populated Egypt.

Reports of dog-headed races can also be traced back to Greek antiquity. In the fifth century BC, the Greek physician Ctesias, in his Indica, wrote a detailed report on the existence of cynocephali in India. Similarly, the Greek traveler Megasthenes claimed to know about dog-headed people in India who lived in the mountains, communicated through barking, wore the skins of wild animals and lived by hunting. Claudius Aelianus also mentioned the dog-headed tribes in India, and he, too, wrote that they are of human shape and clothed in the skins of beasts. He also added that although they have no speech and howled to communicate, they were capable of understanding the Indian language.
Herodotus reports claims by ancient Libyans that such creatures inhabit the east of their lands, as well as headless men and various other anomalies.

The best estimate for the place where the battle between the Argonauts and the Cynocephali took place is modern day North Serbia or South Hungary.

Some Greek writers also mention the Hemicynes (singular, Hemicyon), meaning half-dogs (from "ἡμι" meaning "half" and "κύων" meaning "dog").

Late Antiquity

There is a description of two saints Ahrakas and Augani with a dog's head from the legend about the life of the Coptic saint Mercurius Abu-Sayfain, whom they faithfully served; their image on the icon is in the Coptic Museum.

The cynocephali offered such an evocative image of the magic and brutality deemed characteristic of bizarre people of distant places that they kept returning in medieval literature. St. Augustine of Hippo mentioned the cynocephali in The City of God, Book XVI, Chapter 8, in the context of discussing whether such beings were descendants of Adam; he considered the possibility that they might not exist at all, or might not be human (which Augustine defines as being a mortal and rational animal: homo, id est animal rationale mortale), but insisted that if they were human they were indeed descendants of Adam.

Saint Christopher

In the Eastern Orthodox Church, certain icons covertly identify Saint Christopher with the head of a dog. Christopher pictured with a dog's head is not generally supported by the Orthodox Church, as the icon was proscribed in the 18th century by Moscow.

The roots of that iconography lie in a hagiographic narrative set during the reign of the Emperor Diocletian, which tell of a man named Reprebus, Rebrebus or Reprobus (the "reprobate" or "scoundrel") being captured by Roman forces fighting against tribes dwelling to the west of Egypt in Cyrenaica and forced to join the Roman numerus Marmaritarum or "Unit of the Marmaritae", which suggests an otherwise-unidentified "Marmaritae" (perhaps the same as the Marmaricae Berber tribe of Cyrenaica).  He was reported to be of enormous size, with the head of a dog instead of a man, both apparently being typical of the Marmaritae. He and the unit were later transferred to Syrian Antioch, where bishop Peter of Attalia baptised him and where he was martyred in 308. It has also been speculated that this Byzantine depiction of St. Christopher as dog-headed may have resulted from a misreading of the Latin term Cananeus (Canaanite) as caninus, that is, "canine". 

The late 10th century German bishop and poet Walter of Speyer portrayed St. Christopher as a giant of a cynocephalic species in the land of the Chananeans (Canaan in the New Testament) who ate human flesh and barked. Eventually, Christopher met the Christ child, regretted his former behavior, and received baptism. He, too, was rewarded with a human appearance, whereupon he devoted his life to Christian service and became an Athleta Christi, one of the military saints.

Medieval East
Cynocephali also figure in medieval Christian worldviews. A legend that placed Andrew the Apostle and Bartholomew the Apostle among the Parthians presented the case of "Abominable", the citizen of the "city of cannibals... whose face was like unto that of a dog." After receiving baptism, however, he was released from his doggish aspect.

Ibn Battuta 
Ibn Battuta encountered what were described as "dog-mouthed" people on his journey, possibly describing a group of Mentawai people (who practice tooth sharpening), living on an island between India and Sumatra:

Medieval West

Paul the Deacon mentions cynocephali in his Historia gentis Langobardorum: "They pretend that they have in their camps Cynocephali, that is, men with dogs' heads. They spread the rumor among the enemy that these men wage war obstinately, drink human blood and quaff their own gore if they cannot reach the foe." At the court of Charlemagne, the Norse were given this attribution, implying un-Christian and less-than-human qualities: "I am greatly saddened" said the King of the Franks, in Notker's Life, "that I have not been thought worthy to let my Christian hand sport with these dog-heads." The ninth-century Frankish theologian Ratramnus wrote a letter, the Epistola de Cynocephalis, on whether the Cynocephali should be considered human (he thought that they were). If human, a Christian's duty would be to preach the Gospels to them. If animals, and thus without souls, such would be pointless. Quoting St. Jerome, Thomas of Cantimpré corroborated the existence of Cynocephali in his Liber de Monstruosis Hominibus Orientis, xiv, ("Book of Monstrous men of the Orient"). The thirteenth-century encyclopedist Vincent of Beauvais acquainted his patron Saint Louis IX of France with "an animal with the head of the dog but with all other members of human appearance… Though he behaves like a man… and, when peaceful, he is tender like a man, when furious, he becomes cruel and retaliates on humankind".

The Nowell Codex, perhaps more commonly known as the manuscript containing the Anglo-Saxon epic Beowulf, also contains references to Cynocephali. One such reference can be found in the part of the manuscript known as The Wonders of the East, in which they are called "healfhundingas" or "half-dogs."  Also, in Anglo-Saxon England, the Old English word wulfes heafod ("wolf's head") was a technical term for an outlaw, who could be killed as if he were a wolf. The so-called Leges Edwardi Confessoris, written around 1140, however, offered a somewhat literal interpretation: “[6.2a] For from the day of his outlawry he bears a wolf's head, which is called wluesheued by the English. [6.2b] And this sentence is the same for all outlaws." Cynocephali appear in the Old Welsh poem Pa gur? as cinbin (dogheads). Here they are enemies of King Arthur's retinue; Arthur's men fight them in the mountains of Eidyn (Edinburgh), and hundreds of them fall at the hand of Arthur's warrior Bedwyr (later known as Bedivere). The next lines of the poem also mention a fight with a character named Garwlwyd (Rough-Gray); a Gwrgi Garwlwyd (Man-Dog Rough-Gray) appears in one of the Welsh Triads, where he is described in such a way that scholars have discussed him as a werewolf.

High and late medieval travel literature

Medieval travellers Giovanni da Pian del Carpine and Marco Polo both mention cynocephali. Giovanni writes of the armies of Ögedei Khan who encounter a race of dogheads who live north of the Dalai-Nor (Northern Ocean), or Lake Baikal. The Travels of Marco Polo mentions the dog-headed barbarians on the island of Angamanain, or the Andaman Islands. For Polo, although these people grow spices, they are nonetheless cruel and "are all just like big mastiff dogs". In The Voyage and Travels of Sir John Mandeville, dog-headed men are described as inhabiting the island of Nacumera (the Nicobar Islands).

The dog-headed people were also found in the New World. Christopher Columbus reported that the Taino were familiar with the cynocephali. In 1517, the Ottoman Sultan Selim I was presented with a map of the New World drawn by Piri Reis, which included an image of a dog-headed man fighting a monkey in what is now Colombia. In 1519, the Governor of Cuba instructed Hernán Cortés to investigate rumours of cynocephali while on his expedition to the American mainland. 

According to Henri Cordier, the source of all the fables of the dog-headed barbarians, whether European, Arabic, or Chinese, can be found in the Alexander Romance.

Modern European 
In his feature Giant Egg, David Attenborough speculates that the indri, a type of lemur from Madagascar, may be one possible origin to the myth of dog-headed men.

China

In Central and East Asia a common calendar system consists of a twelve-year cycle, with each year represented as an animal. The eleventh animal of the twelve-year cycle is the dog. Often such animals are depicted as human figures with an animal head. Thus, the cynocephalic depiction of the eleventh zodiac animal is common (possibly with a tail).

Additionally, in the Chinese record Book of Liang, the Buddhist missionary Hui Shen describes an island of dog-headed men to the east of Fusang, a nation he visited variously identified as Japan or the Americas. The History of the Northern Dynasties of Li Dashi and his son, Li Yanshou, Tang historians, also mentions the "dog kingdom".

Modern appearances
The use of dog-headed, human-bodied characters is still very strong in modern literature. In the domain of comics publishing in North America and in Europe many works feature an "all-cynocephalic" cast or use the heads of dogs and other animals together for social comment or other purposes:

 In the Pulitzer Prize winning graphic novel Maus by Art Spiegelman, Jews have human bodies and the heads of mice while characters with their roots in the United States have human bodies and the heads of dogs, Germans have the heads of cats, and the French have the heads of frogs.
 The comic book Ghost Rider features a villain named Doghead. He is an anthropomorphic dog who serves Blackheart, the son of Mephisto, a demon lord falsely claiming to be The Devil. 
 The hero of Baudolino, a novel by Umberto Eco, has to face dog-headed people at the end of his journey.
 Dog-headed creatures based on the ancient accounts appear in many modern role-playing games, such as Dungeons & Dragons.
 A fearsome race of dog-faced warriors appear in Terry Jones's book The Saga of Erik the Viking.
 The title character in Scott Adams' cartoon Dilbert once dated a dog-headed woman, described as "fetching".
 In the 1989 cult film Marquis by Henri Xhonneux, the Marquis de Sade is portrayed as a human with the head of a Spaniel.
 Mr. Peanutbutter, a major character in the Netflix comic psychodrama BoJack Horseman, is a cynocephalic person with the head and other characteristics of a Labrador Retriever.
 The Camp Half-Blood Chronicles feature the Cenocephaly (spelled as "Cynocephali").
 In The Heroes of Olympus book "The Blood of Olympus," the Cynocephali were obtained from Triumvirate Holdings by Octavius.
 In The Trials of Apollo book "The Tyrant's Tomb," the Cynocephali are among the monsters used in Caligula's attack on Camp Jupiter.
 In The Mummy Returns The Scorpion King leads an Army of Jackal Headed Warriors called the Army of Anubis also it is revealed that the only way to kill these creatures is through decapitation
 Paolo Bacigalupi's Ship Breaker trilogy features a race of half-men created for war. Tool is a cynocephalic half-man that is featured in the first two books and is the protagonist of the third.
 One of the many sketches of Saturday Night Live involves a man who attached the head of his dog to the body of his dead relative.
 Dog Man, a series of books for young children written by Dav Pilkey, features a dog-headed policeman as its hero. In the first installment of the series, Dog Man is "created" when a dog and his owner are both injured and a head transplant operation is performed.
In the video game Age of Mythology, the Egyptian civilization has a unique Mythical unit similar to the Mummy Returns' called Anubites, available from worshipping Anubis, who have jackal heads and twin sickles.
 Cynocephali are one of the many creatures included within the mythology fantasy romance novel series, The Cedric Series. In Cedric the Demonic Knight by author Valerie Willis, they are first introduced via Wylleam, a shaman in a cynocephali tribe during the dark ages and close friend to the main character, Lord Cedric du Romulus. This variant is based on the version noted to be pacifist and vegetarians.

Other dog-headed creatures in legend
  The Talmud states that at the time before the Messiah, the "face of the generation will have the face of a dog." Talmud, Sotah 49b; Talmud, Sanhedrin 97a
 The Chinese legend of Fuxi included variations where he had a dog's head, or he and his sister Nüwa had ugly faces.
 In Saami mythology, according to Craig Chalquist, PhD, Padnakjunne ("Dog-Face") are cannibalistic humanoids with dog snouts.
 In the United States there are tales of dog-headed creatures, including the Michigan Dogman, and the wolf-like Beast of Bray Road of Wisconsin.
 The Wulver of Shetland in Scotland.
 Psoglav in Serbian mythology.
 Itbarak in Turkic mythology
 Adlet in Inuit mythology, specifically that of Greenland, Labrador, and Hudson Bay

See also 
 Ghouls and Qutrubs sharing same origin of myth
 Saint Guinefort
 Theriocephaly, generic term for human-shaped bodies with animal heads
 Ulfheðnar, wolf-associated berserkers
 Werewolves, which figure in archaic Greek and other European traditions.

Notes

References
Bromwich, Rachel (2006). Trioedd Ynys Prydein: The Triads of the Island of Britain. University Of Wales Press. .
Ctesias, Indica, as excerpted by Photios in his Epitome, tr. J.H. Freese, available from Livius.org.
Green, Thomas (2007). Concepts of Arthur. Stroud, Gloucestershire: Tempus. .
Megasthenes, Indica, tr. J.W. McCrindle, Ancient India as Described by Megasthenes and Arrian. Calcutta and Bombay: Thacker, Spink, 1877. 30–174, available from Project South Asia
Paul the Deacon, Historia gentis Langobardorum ("History of the Lombards"), ed. L. Bethmann and G. Waitz, "Pauli historia Langobardorum." In MGH Scriptores rerum Langobardicarum et Italicarum 1 (saec. VI-IX), ed. G. Waitz. Hanover, 1878. 12–187; tr. Foulke, W.D. History of the Langobards. Univ. of Pennsylvania, 1907. Available from Northvegr.
Leges Edwardi Confessoris, ed. and tr. Bruce R. O'Brien, God's peace and king's peace: the laws of Edward the Confessor. Philadelphia: Univ. of Pennsylvania Press, 1999. .

External links

Anthony Weir, "A holy dog and a dog-headed saint": St Guinefort and St Christopher Cynephoros or Cynocephalus
Christopher Columbus & the Monstrous Races

Egyptian mythology
Medieval European legendary creatures
Medieval legends
Animals in religion
Anthropomorphic dogs
Mythological dogs
Mythological human hybrids
Legendary tribes in Greco-Roman historiography